The Agence Nationale de l'Aviation Civile du Bénin (ANAC BENIN), in English the Benin National Civil Aviation Agency, is the civil aviation authority of Benin. The agency has its head office in Cotonou.

ANAC Benin was created by decree N°2004-598 of 29 October 2004, replacing the Direction de l'Aviation Civil (Directorate of Civil Aviation).

References

External links

 Agence Nationale de l'Aviation Civile du Bénin 
 Agence Nationale de l’Aviation Civile du Bénin (Archive) 

Benin
Government of Benin
Civil aviation in Benin
Transport organisations based in Benin